Wei-Hua Wang is a Chinese physicist.

Wang completed a doctorate in solid state physics at the Institute of Physics, Chinese Academy of Sciences in July 1993. He subsequently became a visiting scientist at the University of Göttingen between August 1994 and July 1995, then pursued postdoctoral study at the Hahn-Meitner-Institut from August 1995 to July 1997. In August 1997, Wang returned to IOPCAS. In 2013, Wang was elected a fellow of the American Physical Society, recognized "[f]or significant contributions to the understanding of the physical properties of metallic glasses, in particular, the development of the microscopic mechanisms of metallic glass formation and their mechanical properties."

References

Living people
20th-century Chinese physicists
21st-century Chinese physicists
Year of birth missing (living people)
Chinese expatriates in Germany
Fellows of the American Physical Society